Dr. Albert R. Shadle (1885–1963) was an American biologist noted for his research into porcupines and beavers. From 1919 until 1953, Shadle served as chairman of the biology department, and was instrumental in the advancement of science education, at the State University of New York at Buffalo.  He also acted as a professor of biology whose pupils included noted entomologist Maynard Jack Ramsay.

Published works

Journal of Mammalogy 
 1957: Sizes of Beaver Chips Cut from Aspen
 1956: Parturition in a Skunk, Mephitis mephitis hudsonica
 1955: Removal of Foreign Quills by Porcupines
 1955: Pelage of the Porcupine, Erethizon dorsatum dorsatum
 1954: Osteologic Criteria of Age in Beavers
 1953: Gross Anatomy of the Male Reproductive System of the Porcupine
 1950: Feeding, Care, and Handling of Captive Porcupines (Erethizon)
 1949: Rate of Penetration of a Porcupine Spine
 1948: Gestation Period in the Porcupine, Erethizon dorsatum dorsatum
 1946: The Sex Reactions of Porcupines (Erethizon d. dorsatum) before and after Copulation
 1943: An Unusual Porcupine Parturition and Development of the Young
 1943: Comparison of Tree Cuttings of Six Beaver Colonies in Allegany State Park, New York
 1939: Fifteen Months of Beaver Work at Allegany State Park, N. Y.
 1936: The Attrition and Extrusive Growth of the Four Major Incisor Teeth of Domestic Rabbits
 1930: An Unusual Case of Parturition in a Beaver

Journal of Wildlife Management
 1953: Captive Striped Skunk Produces Two Litters
 1946: Copulation in the Porcupine
 1943: Reforestation of Aspen after Complete Cutting by Beavers
 1942: The Deer of Allegany State Park, New York

Other publications 
 1955: Effects of Porcupine Quills in Humans (The American Naturalist)
 1954: Sizes of Wood Cuttings Handled by Beavers (American Midland Naturalist)
 1939: Craspedacusta Again in Western New York (Transactions of the American Microscopical Society)
 1935: A Zipper Tube for Holding Small Live Animals (Science)

References

1885 births
1963 deaths
American biologists
20th-century biologists